This is a list of colleges and schools of Arizona State University. Most of ASU's academic programs are spread across four campuses in the Phoenix Metropolitan Area, ASU Online, and ASU Local. The table below indicates enrollment by college, with an indication of which metropolitan campuses are represented.

References